The Sabot is a sailing dinghy that is sailed and raced singlehandedly usually by young sailors in various parts of the world.

The boat is suitable for amateur production.  Early models were usually made from plywood. More recent models have been made from fiberglass. Variations on the design include the daggerboard-equipped El Toro from the Richmond Yacht Club in San Francisco Bay Area, the US Sabot, the "Naples Sabot" from Naples community of Long Beach, California, as well as Australian varieties, such as the Holdfast Trainer.

See also
Related development
El Toro (dinghy)
Holdfast Trainer
Naples Sabot
US Sabot

References

External links
Australian National Sabot Council
RYCT Off The Beach (OTB) Sailing
Tasmanian Sabot Sailing Association

Dinghies
Sail ships of Australia
Sailboat type designs by Charles McGregor